The Lepidoptera of Fiji consist of both butterflies and moths.

According to a recent estimate, about 1,000 Lepidoptera species are present on Fiji.

Butterflies

Hesperiidae
Badamia atrox subflava Waterhouse, 1920
Badamia exclamationis (Fabricius, 1775)
Hasora chromus bilunata (Butler, 1883)
Hasora chromus khoda (Mabille, 1876)
Oriens augustula (Herrich-Schaeffer, 1869)

Lycaenidae
Callophrys rubi (Linnaeus, 1758)
Catochrysops taitensis taitensis (Boisduval, 1832)
Catopyrops ancyra (Felder, 1860)
Cupidohylax dampierensis (Rothschild, 1915)
Cupidohylax patala (Kollar, 1844)
Deudorix epijarbas diovella Waterhouse, 1920
Euchrysops cnejus samoa (Herrich-Schaeffer, 1869)
Famegana alsulus alsulus (Herrich-Schaeffer, 1869)
Famegana alsulus lulu (Mathew, 1889)
Jamides candrena (Herrich-Schaeffer, 1869)
Jamides pulcherrima Butler, 1884
Lampides boeticus (Linnaeus, 1767)
Nacaduba beroe Felder & Felder, 1865
Nacaduba biocellata armillata (Butler, 1875)
Nacaduba dyopa (Herrich-Schaeffer, 1869)
Nacaduba gemmata Druce, 1887
Nacaduba samoensis Druce, 1892
Strymon bazochii gundlachianus Bates, 1935
Thecla agra Hewitson, 1868
Zizina communis Herrich-Schaeffer, 1869
Zizina hylax (Fabricius, 1775)
Zizina labradus labradus (Godart, 1824)
Zizina labradus mangoensis (Butler, 1884)

Nymphalidae
Acraea andromacha polynesiaca Rebel, 1911
Anosia menippe Hübner, 1816
Danaus archippus (Fabricius, 1793)
Danaus plexippus (Linnaeus, 1758)
Doleschallia bisaltide vomana Fruhstorfer, 1902
Euploea boisduvalii boisduvalii Lucas, 1853
Euploea helcita escholtzii Felder & Felder, 1865: 345
Euploea intermedia (Moore, 1883)
Euploea jessica Butler, 1869
Euploea leucostictos macleayii Felder & Felder, 1865
Euploea lewinii eschscholtzii Felder & Felder, 1865
Euploea proserpina Butler, 1866
Euploea tulliolus forsteri Felder & Felder, 1865
Hypolimnas antilope lutescens (Butler, 1874)
Hypolimnas bolina pallescens Butler, 1874
Hypolimnas eriphile (Cramer, 1782)
Hypolimnas inopinata Waterhouse, 1920
Hypolimnas octocula octocula Butler, 1869
Hypolimnas tracta (Swinhoe, 1916)
Junonia villida villida (Fabricius, 1787)
Melanitis leda levuna Fruhstorfer, 1908
Melanitis leda solandra (Fabricius, 1775)
Polyura caphontis caphontis (Hewitson, 1863)
Polyura caphontis excellens Turlin, 2001
Polyura caphontis nambavatua Smiles, 1982
Taenaris phorcas Westwood, 1858
Tirumala claribella (Butler, 1882)
Tirumala hamata mellitula (Herrich-Schaeffer, 1869)
Tirumala hamata neptunica (Felder & Felder, 1865)
Tirumala moderata (Butler, 1875)
Tirumala protoneptunia (Poulton, 1924)
Vagrans egista vitiensis (Waterhouse, 1920)
Vanessa itea (Fabricius, 1775)
Xois fulvida Butler, 1883
Xois sesara Hewitson, 1865
Ypthima vitiensis (Fruhstorfer in Seitz, 1911)

Papilionidae
Papilio godeffroyi Semper, 1866
Papilio schmeltzi Herrich-Schaeffer, 1869

Pieridae
Anaphaeis clarissa Butler, 1883
Anaphaeis vitiensis Fruhstorfer, 1902
Appias albina (Boisduval, 1836)
Appias athama (Lucas, 1852)
Belenois java micronesia (Fruhstorfer, 1902)
Catopsilia pomona (Fabricius, 1775)
Catopsilia pyranthe lactea Butler, 1870
Catopsilia scylla gorgophone (Boisduval, 1836)
Cepora nabis (Lucas, 1852)
Cepora perimale perithea (Felder & Felder, 1865)
Delias blanca nausicae Fruhstorfer, 1899
Eurema briggata australis (Wallace, 1867)
Eurema hecabe aprica (Butler, 1883)
Eurema hecabe hecabe (Linnaeus, 1758)
Eurema hecabe sulphurata (Butler, 1875)
Pieris peristhene rapae (Linnaeus, 1758)
Pieris peristhene vitiensis Fruhstorfer, 1902

Moths

Aganaidae
Asota woodfordi (Druce, 1888)

Agathiphagidae
Agathiphaga vitiensis Dumbleton, 1952

Agonoxenidae
Agonoxena argaula Meyrick, 1921
Agonoxena sp. [Dugdale, 1978]

Alucitidae
Alucita pygmaea Meyrick, 1890

Arctiidae
Amerila astrea (Drury, 1773)
Argina astraea (Drury, 1773)
Argina cribraria (Clerck, 1764)
Euchromia creusa (Linnaeus, 1758)
Euchromia vitiensis Hampson, 1903
Hypsa lacticinia (Cramer, 1779)
Macaduma corvina Felder & Rogenhofer, 1875
Macaduma montana Robinson, 1975
Macaduma striata Robinson, 1975
Nyctemera baulus baulus (Boisduval, 1832)
Nyctemera baulus fasciata Walker, 1856
Oeonistis delia (Fabricius, 1787)
Utetheisa clarae Robinson, 1971
Utetheisa lotrix (Cramer, 1777)
Utetheisa pulchelloides pulchelloides Hampson, 1907
Utetheisa pulchelloides marsallorum Rothschild, 1910

Autostichidae
Autosticha demias Meyrick, 1886
Autosticha dianeura Meyrick, 1939
Autosticha solita Meyrick, 1923

Batrachedridae
Batrachedra atriloqua Meyrick, 1931

Blastobasidae
Blastobasis sp. [Dugdale, 1978]
Blastobasis lososi Adamski & Brown, 2002

Carposinidae
Meridarchis sp. [Dugdale, 1978]
Species of an undetermined genus [Dugdale, 1978]

Choreutidae
Anthophila chalcotoxa Meyrick, 1886
Brenthia melodica Meyrick, 1922

Coleophoridae
Coleophora immortalis Meyrick, 1922

Copromorphidae
Copromorpha gypsota Meyrick, 1886
Copromorpha pyrrhoscia Meyrick, 1935

Cosmopterygidae

Anatrachyntis megacentra (Meyrick, 1923)
Ascalenia armigera Meyrick, 1923
Ascalenia thoracista Meyrick, 1932
Asymphorodes flexa (Meyrick, 1921)
Cosmopterix chrysocrates Meyrick, 1919
Cosmopterix dulcivora Meyrick, 1919
Cosmopterix epizona Meyrick, 1897
Cosmopterix gloriosa Meyrick, 1922
Glaphyristis politicopa Meyrick, 1934
Idiostyla catharopis Meyrick, 1922
Idiostyla oculata Meyrick, 1921
Labdia allotriopa Meyrick, 1923
Labdia calida Meyrick, 1921
Labdia clytemnestra Meyrick, 1923
Labdia hastifera Meyrick, 1920
Labdia intuens Meyrick, 1923
Labdia microdictyas Meyrick, 1923
Labdia orthritis Meyrick, 1930
Labdia petroxesta Meyrick, 1921
Labdia rationalis Meyrick, 1921
Labdia saponacea Meyrick, 1922
Labdia scenodoxa Meyrick, 1923
Labdia spirocosma Meyrick, 1921
Limnaecia anthophaga Meyrick, 1928
Limnaecia capsigera Meyrick, 1921
Limnaecia cirrhochrosta Meyrick, 1933
Limnaecia fuscipalpis Meyrick, 1921
Limnaecia inconcinna Meyrick, 1923
Limnaecia phaeopleura Meyrick, 1924
Persicoptila anthomima Meyrick, 1921
Persicoptila aquilifera Meyrick, 1932
Persicoptila phoenoxantha Meyrick, 1923
Proterocosma epizona Meyrick, 1886
Proterocosma triplanetis Meyrick, 1886
Pyroderces euryspora Meyrick, 1922
Pyroderces paroditis Meyrick, 1928
Pyroderces terminella (Walker, 1864)
Stagmatophora cyma Bradley, 1953
Stagmatophora erebinthia Meyrick, 1921
Stagmatophora flexa Meyrick, 1921
Trissodoris honorariella (Walsingham, 1907)
Ulochora streptosema Meyrick, 1920

Cossidae
Acritocera negligens Butler, 1886

Crambidae
Aeolopetra palaeanthes Meyrick, 1934
Aethaloessa floridalis (Zeller, 1852)
Agrioglypta enneactis Meyrick, 1932
Alloperissa creagraula Meyrick, 1934
Ambia parachrysis Meyrick, 1935
Aglaops homaloxantha (Meyrick, 1933)
Aphrophantis velifera Meyrick, 1933
Argyria polyniphas Meyrick, 1932
Atomoclostis deltosema Meyrick, 1934
Aulacodes nephelanthopa Meyrick, 1934
Autarotis euryala Meyrick, 1886
Authaeretis eridora Meyrick, 1886
Autocharis senatoria (Meyrick, 1932)
Auxolophotis cosmophilopis (Meyrick, 1934)
Auxolophotis ioxanthias Meyrick, 1933
Angustalius hapaliscus (Zeller, 1852)
Angustalius malacellus (Duponchel, 1836)
Botyodes asialis Guenée, 1854
Bradina chalcophaea Meyrick, 1932
Bradina cirrhophanes Meyrick, 1932
Bradina craterotoxa Meyrick, 1932
Bradina erilitalis (Felder & Rogenhofer, 1875)
Bradina haplomorpha Meyrick, 1932
Bradina leptographa Meyrick, 1932
Bradina leucura Hampson, 1897
Bradina metaleucalis Walker, 1866
Bradina miantodes Meyrick, 1932
Bradina parallela (Meyrick, 1886)
Bradina porphyroclista Meyrick, 1934
Bradina punctilinealis Hampson, 1907
Bradina semnopa Meyrick, 1886
Bradina stigmophanes Meyrick, 1932
Bradina trispila (Meyrick, 1886)
Calamotropha dielota (Meyrick, 1886)
Cnaphalocrocis exigua (Butler, 1879)
Cnaphalocrocis perinephes (Meyrick, 1886)
Cnaphalocrocis ruralis (Walker, 1859)
Cnaphalocrocis suspicalis (Walker, 1859)
Cnaphalocrocis trapezalis (Guenée, 1854)
Cnaphalocrocis trebiusalis (Walker, 1859)
Compsophila iocosma Meyrick, 1886
Conogethes punctiferalis (Guenée, 1854)
Crocidolomia pavonana (Fabricius, 1794)
Cryptographis cucurbitalis (Guenée, 1862)
Cryptographis glauculalis (Guenée, 1854)
Cryptographis indica (Saunders, 1851)
Culladia cuneiferellus (Walker, 1863)
Culladia paralyticus (Meyrick, 1932)
Diasemia endoschista Meyrick, 1932
Diasemiopsis ramburialis (Duponchel, 1834)
Dichocrosis fluminalis Butler, 1883
Diplopseustis perieresalis (Walker, 1859)
Diptychophora sp. [Dugdale, 1978]
Dracaenura agramma Meyrick, 1882
Dracaenura asthenota Meyrick, 1886)
Dracaenura myota Meyrick, 1886)
Dracaenura pelochra Meyrick, 1886)
Dracaenura stenosoma (Felder & Rogenhofer, 1875)
Eoophyla albipuncta Clayton, 2017
Eoophyla crisota (Meyrick, 
Eoophyla lutea Clayton, 2017
Eoophyla hexalitha (Meyrick, 1886)
Eoophyla montana Clayton, 2017
Eoophyla nephelanthopa (Meyrick, 1934)
Eoophyla vitiensis Clayton, 2017
Eumaragma orthiopis Meyrick, 1933
Eurytorna heterodoxa Meyrick, 1886
Glaucocharis bathrogramma (Meyrick, 1933)
Glaucocharis clandestina Gaskin, 1985
Glaucocharis fehrei Gaskin, 1985
Glaucocharis fijiensis Gaskin, 1985
Glaucocharis penetrata (Meyrick, 1933)
Glaucocharis praemialis (Meyrick, 1931)
Glaucocharis robinsoni Gaskin, 1985
Glaucocharis sericophthalma Meyrick, 1933
Glaucocharis simmondsi Gaskin, 1975
Glaucocharis tyriochrysa (Meyrick, 1933)
Glyphodes caesalis Walker, 1859
Glyphodes cymocraspeda (Meyrick, 1932)
Glyphodes diplocyma Hampson, 1912
Glyphodes multilinealis Kenrick, 1907
Glyphodes stolalis Guenée, 1854
Haritalodes adjunctalis Leraut, 2005
Hellula undalis (Fabricius, 1781)
Heortia vitessoides (Moore, 1885)
Herpetogramma licarsisalis (Walker, 1859)
Herpetogramma phaeopteralis (Guenée, 1854)
Herpetogramma rudis (Warren, 1892)
Hoploscopa anamesaTams, 1935
Hoploscopa astrapias Meyrick, 1886
Hyalobathra xanthocrossa Meyrick, 1932
Hydriris ornatalis (Duponchel, 1832)
Hymenoptychis sordida Zeller, 1852
Lamprosema allocosma (Meyrick, 1886)
Lamprosema foedalis (Guenée, 1854)
Lamprosema leucostrepta (Meyrick, 1886)
Lamprosema opsocausta (Meyrick, 1935)
Lipararchis hyacinthopa Meyrick, 1934
Lygropispha eoxantha Meyrick, 1933
Macaretaera hesperis Meyrick, 1886
Maruca vitrata (Fabricius, 1787)
Meroctena tullalis Walker, 1859
Meroctena sirioxantha (Meyrick, 1886)
Nacoleia octasema (Meyrick, 1886)
Nymphicula australis  (Felder & Rogenhofer, 1874) 
Nymphicula cyanolitha (Meyrick, 1886)
Oligostigma barbararcha Meyrick, 1932
Oligostigma chrysotum (Meyrick, 1886)
Oligostigma polydectale (Walker, 1859)
Omiodes diemenalis (Guenée, 1854)
Omiodes indicata (Fabricius, 1775)
Omphisa illisalis Walker, 1859
Pagyda tremula Meyrick, 1932
Palpita spilogramma (Meyrick, 1934
Palpita spinosa Clayton, 2008
Palpita vitiensis Clayton, 2008
Paracentristis incommoda Meyrick, 1934
Parapoynx unilinealis (Snellen van Vollenhoven, 1876)
Parapoynx villidalis (Walker, 1859)
Parotis marginata (Hampson, 1893)
Parotis niphopepla (Meyrick, 1933)
Parotis sp. [Dugdale, 1978]
Parotis suralis (Lederer, 1863)
Piletocera albescens Rebel, 1915
Piletocera argopis (Meyrick, 1886)
Piletocera cyclospila (Meyrick, 1886)
Piletocera dactyloptila (Meyrick, 1886)
Piletocera enneaspila Meyrick, 1933
Piletocera erebina Butler, 1886
Piletocera melanauges (Meyrick, 1886)
Piletocera microcentra (Meyrick, 1886)
Piletocera nasonia Meyrick, 1933
Piletocera nigrescens (Butler, 1886)
Piletocera ocelligera Meyrick, 1932)
Piletocera ochrosema (Meyrick, 1886)
Piletocera pseudadelpha (Meyrick, 1887)
Piletocera rhopalophora Meyrick, 1934
Piletocera signiferalis (Wallengren, 1860)
Piletocera ulophanes Meyrick, 1886
Piletocera xanthosoma (Meyrick, 1886)
Pilocrocis eriomorpha Meyrick, 1933
Pilocrocis stephanorma Meyrick, 1935
Prodelophanes eucharis Meyrick, 1937
Prophantis octoguttalis (Felder & Rogenhofer, 1875)
Prototyla alopecopa Meyrick, 1933
Prototyla haemoxantha Meyrick, 1935
Psara acrospila (Meyrick, 1886)
Psara stultalis (Walker, 1859)
Ptiladarcha consularis Meyrick, 1933
Pycnarmon cribrata (Fabricius, 1794)
Rehimena infundibulalis (Snellen van Vollenhoven, 1882)
Rehimena phrynealis (Walker, 1859)
Sameodes cancellalis (Zeller, 1852)
Scirpophaga imparellus (Meyrick, 1879)
Scirpophaga nivella (Fabricius, 1794)
Scoparia orthioplecta Meyrick, 1937
Spoladea recurvalis (Fabricius, 1775)
Stemorrhages oceanitis Meyrick, 1886
Sufetula sp. [Dugdale, 1978]
Syllepte cohaesalis (Walker, 186)
Syllepte derogata (Fabricius, 1775)
Syllepte sabinusalis (Walker, 1859)
Tatobotys biannulalis (Walker, 1866)
Terastia meticulosalis Guenée, 1854
Trigamozeucta radiciformis Meyrick, 1937

Epermeniidae
Epermenia symmorias Meyrick, 1923

Epiplemidae
Epiplema conchiferata Moore, 1887
Epiplema cretosa Swinhoe, 1902
Epiplema lomalangi Robinson, 1975
Epiplema simmondsi Robinson, 1975
Europlema semibrunnea (Pagenstecher, 1888)
Gathynia albibasis Warren, 1896
Phazaca cythera (Swinhoe, 1902)
Phazaca nakula Clayton, 2002
Phazaca yasawa (Robinson, 1975)

Erebidae
Achaea janata (Linnaeus, 1758)
Achaea robinsoni Holloway in Barlow, 1982
Achaea serva (Fabricius, 1775)
Aedia leucomelas (Linnaeus, 1758)
Aedia sericea (Butler, 1882)
Anomis esocampta Hampson, 1926
Anomis figlina Butler, 1889
Anomis sabulifera Guenée, 1852
Anomis samoana (Butler, 1886)
Anticarsia irrorata (Fabricius, 1781)
Araeopteron griseata Hampson, 1907
Attonda adspersa (Felder & Rogenhofer, 1874)
Avatha discolor (Fabricius, 1794)
Bastilla vitiensis (Butler, 1886)
Catada charalis Swinhoe, 1900
Catadoides fijiensis Robinson, 1975
Catadoides vunindawa Robinson, 1975
Chalciope alcyona (Druce, 1888)
Chrysopera combinans (Walker, 1858)
Cosmophila flava (Fabricius, 1775)
Dichromia quinqualis Walker, 1859
Dichromia trigonalis Guenée, 1854
Diomea fenella Robinson, 1969
Dysgonia anetica (Felder & Rogenhofer, 1875)
Dysgonia duplicata (Robinson, 1975)
Dysgonia hicanora (Turner, 1903)
Dysgonia illibata (Fabricius, 1775)
Dysgonia joviana (Stoll in Cramer, 1782)
Dysgonia koroensis (Robinson, 1969)
Dysgonia myops (Guenée, 1852)
Dysgonia prisca (Walker, 1858)
Dysgonia propyrrha (Walker, 1858)
Echanella hirsutipennis Robinson, 1975
Entomogramma torsa Guenée, 1852
Ercheia kebea Bethune-Baker, 1906
Ericeia congregata (Walker, 1858)
Ericeia inangulata levuensis Prout, 1929
Ericeia leichardtii (Koch, 1865)
Erygia precedens (Walker, 1857)
Eublemma anachoresis (Wallengren, 1863)
Eublemma baccalix (Swinhoe, 1886)
Eublemma cochylioides (Guenée, 1852)
Eublemma innocens (Butler, 1886)
Eublemma pudica (Snellen van Vollenhoven, 1880)
Eublemma ragusana (Freyer, 1844)
Eublemma rivula (Moore, 1882)
Eublemmoides crassiuscula (Walker, 1864)
Gonitis editrix (Guenée, 1852)
Gonitis involuta vitiensis (Butler, 1886)
Grammodes geometrica (Fabricius, 1775)
Grammodes oculicola Walker, 1858
Harita nodyna (Bethune-Baker, 1908)
Helicoverpa armigera (Hübner, 1809)
Helicoverpa assulta (Guenée, 1852: 178 [Heliothis]
Helicoverpa zea (Boddie, 1850)
Hypena commixtura (Swinhoe, 1918)
Hypena conscitalis Walker, 1865
Hypena cryptica Robinson, 1975
Hypena duplicalis (Walker, 1859
Hypena fijiensis Robinson, 1975
Hypena gonospilalis Walker, 1865
Hypena iconicalis Walker, 1859
Hypena laceratalis Walker, 1859
Hypena masurialis Guenée, 1854
Hypena robustalis Snellen van Vollenhoven, 1880
Hypenagonia anna Robinson, 1975
Hypenagonia barbara Robinson, 1975
Hypenagonia catherina Robinson, 1975
Hypenagonia diana Robinson, 1975
Hypenagonia emma Robinson, 1975
Hyperlopha cristifera (Walker, 1865)
Hypocala deflorata (Fabricius, 1794)
Hypocala rosrata (Fabricius, 1794)
Hypospila similis similis Tams, 1935
Hypospila similis fijiensis Robinson, 1975
Lacera contrasta Holloway, 1979
Lacera noctilio (Fabricius, 1794)
Luceria oculalis (Moore, 1877)
Maliattha melanesiensis Robinson, 1975
Maliattha ritsemae (Snellen van Vollenhoven, 1880)
Mecistoptera sp. near albisigna Hampson [teste Robinson 1975]
Mecodina variata Robinson, 1969
Mocis frugalis (Fabricius, 1775)
Mocis trifasciata (Stephens, 1829)
Mocis undata (Fabricius, 1775)
Nagia robinsoni Holloway, 1982
Neogabara plagiola Wileman & West, 1929
Ophiusa coronata (Fabricius, 1775)
Ophiusa disjungens tongaensis (Hampson, 1913)
Ophiusa fijiensis (Robinson, 1969)
Oruza cariosa (Lucas, 1894)
Oxyodes scrobiculata samoana Tams, 1935
Oxyodes scrobiculata scrobiculata (Fabricius, 1775)
Oxyodes scrobiculata tanymekes Tams, 1935
Pantara ophiusalis lunifera (Druce, 1888)
Pantydia metaspila (Walker, 1857)
Papuacola costalis (Moore, 1883)
Parallelia arctotaenia (Guenée, 1852)
Parilyrgis concolor Bethune-Baker, 1908
Polydesma boarmoides Guenée, 1852
Ptochosiphla oedipus Meyrick, 1933
Remigia vitiensis (Hampson, 1913)
Rhesala irregularis circuluncus Holloway, 1979
Rhesalides asphalta (Swinhoe, 1901)
Rivula dipterygosoma Tams, 1935
Rivula maxwelli Robinson, 1975
Rivula polynesiana Hampson, 1926
Rusicada fulvida Guenée, 1852
Rusicada nigritarsis nigritarsis (Walker, 1857)
Rusicada nigritarsis xanthochroa (Butler, 1886)
Rusicada revocans (Walker, 1858)
Rusicada vulpina (Butler, 1886)
Schrankia furoroa Robinson, 1975
Schrankia vitiensis Robinson, 1975
Serrodes campana callipepla Prout, 1929
Serrodes mediopallens Prout, 1924
Speiredonia mutabilis (Fabricius, 1794)
Speiredonia simplex obalauae Bethune-Baker, 1915
Speiredonia strigiformis (Robinson, 1975)
Thyas coronata (Fabricius, 1775)
Thyas honesta Hübner, 1824
Thyas miniacea (Felder & Rogenhofer, 1874)
Thyas regia Lucas, 1894
Trigonodes cephise (Cramer, 1779)
Trigonodes hyppasia (Cramer, 1779)

Herminiinae
Bocana manifestalis Walker, 1858
Hydrillodes lentalis Guenée, 1854
Hydrillodes surata Meyrick, 1910
Lophocoleus acuta Robinson, 1975
Lophocoleus albipuncta Robinson, 1975
Lophocoleus iridescens Robinson, 1975
Lophocoleus mirabilis Butler, 1886
Lophocoleus rubrescens Robinson, 1975
Lophocoleus suffusa Robinson, 1975
Lophoptera hemithyris (Hampson, 1905)
Palaeocoleus sypnoides (Butler, 1886)
Progonia micrastis (Meyrick, 1902)
Raganagra vatalis (Walker, 1859)
Simplicia caeneusalis (Walker, 1859)
Tholocoleus astrifer (Butler, 1886)

Euteliidae
Anigraea ochrobasis Hampson, 1912
Anigraea pectinata Robinson, 1975
Paectes fijiensis Robinson, 1975
Pataeta carbo (Guenée, 1852)
Penicillaria dinawa Bethune-Baker, 1906
Penicillaria jocosatrix Guenée, 1852
Penicillaria magnifica (Robinson, 1975)
Penicillaria meeki Bethune-Baker, 1906
Penicillaria nugatrix Guenée in Boisduval & Guenée, 1852
Targalla barbara (Robinson, 1975)
Targalla delatrix (Guenée, 1852)
Targalla palliatrix (Guenée, 1852)

Stictopterinae
Gyrtona acutipennis (Robinson, 1975)
Gyrtona hopkinsi Tams, 1935
Gyrtona purpurea Robinson, 1975
Gyrtona rotundipennis (Robinson, 1975)
Stictoptera cucullioides Guenée, 1852
Stictoptera describens (Walker, 1857)
Stictoptera obalaui Bethune-Baker, 1916
Stictoptera stygia Hampson, 1912
Stictoptera vitiensis Hampson, 1912

Gelechiidae
Anarsia sp. near sagittaria Meyrick [Dugdale, 1978]
Atasthalistis hieropla Meyrick, 1919
Dichomeris hieropla (Meyrick, 1919)
Dichomeris siderosema Turner, 1919
Hypatima brachyrrhiza (Meyrick, 1921)
Hypatima mycetinopa (Meyrick, 1934)
Hypatima tephroplintha (Meyrick, 1923)
Idiophantis chiridota Meyrick, 1914
Mesophleps epiochra (Meyrick, 1886)
Myconita lipara Bradley, 1953
Pectinophora gossypiella Saunders, 1843
Phthorimaea operculella (Zeller, 1873)
Scrobipalpa heliopa (Lower, 1900)
Sitotroga cerealella (Olivier, 1789)
Sitotroga horogramma (Meyrick, 1921)
Thiotricha sp. near strophiacma Meyrick [Dugdale, 1978]

Geometridae
Agathia pisina Butler, 1887
Anisodes lautokensis Prout, 1929
Aplochora vivilaca (Walker, 1861)
Bosara linda (Robinson, 1975)
Brabira apatopleura Prout, 1934
Bulonga phillipsi Prout, 1930
Casbia aedoea Robinson, 1975
Casbia alphitoniae Prout, 1929
Casuariclystis latifascia (Walker, 1866)
Catoria camelaria carbonata Warren, 1896
Catoria hemiprosopa (Turner, 1904)
Chloroclystis bosora (Druce, 1888)
Chloroclystis encteta Prout, 1934
Chloroclystis hypotmeta Prout, 1934
Chloroclystis katherina Robinson, 1975
Chloroclystis mariae Robinson, 1975
Chloroclystis pyrsodonta Turner, 1922
Chloroclystis rubicunda Prout, 1934
Cleora diversa Robinson, 1971
Cleora fowlesi Robinson, 1971
Cleora injectaria injectaria (Walker, 1860)
Cleora injectaria anidryta Prout, 1928
Cleora lanaris (Butler, 1886)
Cleora munditibia munditibia Prout, 1929
Cleora munditibia lauensis Robinson, 1975
Cleora nausori (Bethune-Baker, 1905)
Cleora ochricollis (Prout, 1934)
Cleora perstricta Prout, 1934
Cleora samoana fijiensis Robinson, 1975
Cleora samoana noatau Robinson, 1975
Cleora vitensis (Bethune-Baker, 1905)
Clepsimelia phryganeoides Warren, 1897
Collix lasiospila (Meyrick, 1886)
Collix olivia Robinson, 1975
Collix patricia Robinson, 1975
Comibaena cheramota (Meyrick, 1886)
Comostola pyrrhogona augustata (Prout, 1917)
Comostola rhodoselas (Prout, 1928)
Cypra delicatula Boisduval, 1832
Eoasthena catharia Prout, 1934
Eoasthena extranea Prout, 1934
Eoasthena gnophobathra Prout, 1934
Eoasthena quilla Robinson, 1975
Eoasthena rowena Robinson, 1975
Eoasthena stygna Prout, 1934
Eois sp. near pyrauges Prout [teste Robinson 1975]
Episteira nigrilinearia enochra (Prout, 1934)
Eucrostis disparata (Walker, 1861)
Eucyclodes pieroides (Walker, 1861)
Eupithecia vermiculata Snellen van Vollenhoven, 1874
Glaucoclystis sp. [teste Hollway, 1979]
Gonodonta clelia (Cramer, 1780)
Gymnoscelis concinna concinna Swinhoe, 1902
Gymnoscelis concinna nephelota Prout, 1958
Gymnoscelis erymna Meyrick, 1886: 192
Gymnoscelis imparatalis (Walker, 1865)
Gymnoscelis sara Robinson, 1975
Gymnoscelis tristrigosa (Butler, 1880)
Gymnoscelis tylocera Prout, 1930
Horisme chlorodesma (Meyrick, 1886)
Horisme rewaensis (Bethune-Baker, 1905)
Horisme teresa Robinson, 1975
Hybridoneura picta (Warren, 1901)
Idaea bathromyses (Prout, 1934)
Idaea dicenea Prout, 1934
Idaea rhipistis (Meyrick, 1886)
Maxates albifulgens (Prout, 1934)
Maxates quadrizona (Prout, 1934)
Maxates stuhlmanni (Prout in Seitz, 1933)
Mesotrophe harrietae (Robinson, 1975)
Mesurodes erichlora (Meyrick, 1886)
Micrulia tenuilinea Warren, 1896
Mnesiloba eupitheciata (Walker, 1863)
Nadagara irretracta levuensis Robinson, 1975
Pasiphilodes nina (Robinson, 1975)
Pasiphilodes subtrita (Walker, 1866)
Pelagodes veraria (Guenée, 1857)
Perixera ceramis Meyrick, 1886
Perixera gloria (Robinson, 1975)
Perixera niveopuncta (Warren, 1897)
Perixera obliviaria (Walker, 1861)
Perixera porphyropis Meyrick, 1888
Perixera prionodes Meyrick, 1886: 209
Perixera samoana (Warren, 1897)
Petelia aesyla Prout, 1930
Poecilasthena inhaesa Prout, 1934
Poecilasthena leucydra Prout, 1934
Polyclysta gonycrota Prout, 1932
Probithia sesquilinea (Prout, 1930)
Pseudoeryrthrolophus bipunctatus idmon (Prout, 1930)
Ruttelerona presbytica Robinson, 1975
Sauris acanthina Prout, 1930
Sauris dentalineata (Warren, 1905)
Sauris elaica (Meyrick, 1886)
Sauris hirudinata Guenée, 1858
Sauris priva Prout, 1930
Sauris ursula Robinson, 1975
Sauris victoria Robinson, 1975
Sauris wanda Robinson, 1975
Sauris xissa Robinson, 1975
Scardamia eucampta Prout, 1930
Scopula epigypsa (Meyrick, 1886)
Scopula homodoxa (Meyrick, 1886)
Scopula julietae Robinson, 1975
Scopula sublinearia ida Robinson, 1975
Scotocyma miscix Prout, 1934
Semiothisa abydata (Guenée, 1857)
Spiralisigna acidna (Turner, 1904)
Symmacra solidaria baptata (Warren, 1897)
Symmimetis merceri Robinson, 1975
Symmimetis thorectes Prout, 1934
Thalassodes chloropsis Meyrick, 1886
Thalassodes figurata Robinson, 1968
Thalassodes fiona Robinson, 1975
Thalassodes liquescens Prout, 1934
Thalassodes opalina Butler, 1880
Thalassodes pilaria Guenée, 1858
Thalassodes quadraria Guenée, 1857

Glyphipterygidae
Ernolytis chlorospora Meyrick, 1922
Glyphipterix isoclista Meyrick, 1925

Gracilariidae
Acrocercops caerula (Meyrick, 1912)
Acrocercops centrometra (Meyrick, 1920)
Acrocercops habroscia Meyrick, 1921
Acrocercops macroclina Meyrick, 1916
Acrocercops patellata Meyrick, 1921
Acrocercops praesecta Meyrick, 1922
Acrocercops sarcocrossa Meyrick, 1924
Acrocercops sp. near albidorsala Bradley [teste Dugdale, 1978]
Acrocercops sp. near pavonicola Vári [teste Dugdale, 1978]
Caloptilia palaearcha (Meyrick, 1930)
Caloptilia soyella Van Deventer, 1904
Caloptilia xanthopharella Meyrick, 1880
Conopomorpha oceanica Bradley, 1986
Cyphosticha caerulea Meyrick, 1912
Gracilaria glyphidopis Meyrick, 1934
Gracilaria heroscelis Meyrick, 1939
Liocrobyla paraschista Meyrick, 1916
Parectopa phoenicaula Meyrick, 1934
Phyllonoryctyer aglaozona (Meyrick, 1882)
Timodora callicirrha Meyrick, 1924

Heliodinidae
Stathmopoda dracaenopa Meyrick, 1933
Stathmopoda iocycla Meyrick, 1933
Stathmopoda niphocarpa Meyrick, 1937
Stathmopoda synchrysa Meyrick, 1923
Stathmopoda trichrysa (Meyrick, 1920)
Stathmopoda xanthodesma Meyrick, 1931

Hepialidae
Phassodes vitiensis (Rothschild, 1895)

Hyblaeidae
Hyblaea puera (Cramer, 1777)
Hyblaea sanguinea sanguinea Gaede, 1917
Hyblaea sanguinea vitiensis Prout, 1919

Immidae
Imma autodoxa Meyrick, 1886
Imma chlorospila Meyrick, 1923
Imma harpagacma Meyrick, 1935
Imma leucomystis Meyrick, 1923
Imma philonoma Meyrick, 1925
Imma pyrophthalma Meyrick, 1937
Imma trachyptila Meyrick, 1921

Limacodidae
Beggina albifascia Robinson, 1975
Beggina bicornis Clayton, 2002
Beggina dentilinea Robinson, 1975
Beggina mediopunctata Robinson, 1975
Beggina minima Robinson, 1975
Beggina unicornis Robinson, 1975
Beggina zena Robinson, 1975

Lymantriidae
Adetoneura lentiginosa Collenette, 1933
Calliteara fidjiensis (Mabille & Vuillot, 1890)
Calliteara flavobrunnea (Robinson, 1969)
Calliteara nandarivatus (Robinson, 1968)

Lyonetiidae
Lyonetia luxurians Meyrick, 1922
Lyonetia spinitarsis Meyrick, 1922
Phrixosceles fibulatrix Meyrick, 1922
Phruriastis meliphaga Meyrick, 1923
Pontodryas loxosema Meyrick, 1920
Vanicela sp. [Dugdale, 1978]
Species of an undetermined genus [Dugdale, 1978]

Nepticulidae
Stigmella sp. [teste Nieuwkerken & Berg 2003]

Noctuidae
Aegilia vitiscribens Holloway, 1985
Agrapha albostriata (Bremer & Grey, 1853)
Agrotis aneituma Walker, 1865
Agrotis ipsilon (Hüfnagel, 1766)
Agrotis munda Walker, 1856
Amyna abyssa (Snellen van Vollenhoven, 1880)
Amyna natalis (Walker, 1858)
Amyna octo (Guenée, 1852)
Amyna punctum (Fabricius, 1794)
Arcte coerulea (Guenée, 1852)
Arcte modesta Van der Hoeven, 1840
Argyrogramma signata (Fabricius, 1792)
Arsacia rectalis (Walker, 1863)
Athetis nonagrica (Walker, 1864)
Athetis reclusa (Walker, 1862)
Athetis striolata (Butler, 1886)
Athetis thoracica (Moore, 1884)
Callopistria argyrosemastis (Hampson, 1918)
Callopistria exotica (Guenée, 1852)
Callopistria maillardi (Guenée, 1862)
Callopistria meridionalis rotumensis Robinson, 1975
Callopistria reticulata (Pagenstecher, 1884)
Chasmina candida (Walker, 1865)
Chasmina tibialis (Fabricius, 1775)
Chasmina viridis Robinson, 1975
Chrysodeixis acuta (Walker, 1858)
Chrysodeixis chalcites (Esper, 1789)
Chrysodeixis eriosoma (Doubleday, 1843)
Chrysodeixis illuminata (Robinson, 1968)
Condica conducta (Walker, 1857)
Condica dolorosa (Walker, 1865)
Condica illecta (Walker, 1865)
Dactyloplusia impulsa  (Walker, 1865)
Diarsia intermixta (Guenée, 1852)
Dyrzela trichoptera Robinson, 1975
Eudocima fullonia (Clerck, 1764)
Eudocima materna (Linnaeus, 1758)
Eudocima paulii (Robinson, 1968)
Eudocima salaminia (Cramer, 1777)
Graphanina disjungens (Walker, 1868)
Leucania fiyu Hreblay & Yoshimatsu, 1998
Leucania scotti Butler, 1886
Lignispalta caerulea (Robinson, 1969)
Mudaria sp. near leprosticta (Hampson) [teste Robinson, 1975]
Mythimna aroroyensis (Calora, 1966)
Mythimna loreyi (Duponchel, 1827)
Mythimna separata (Walker, 1864)
Mythimna unipuncta (Haworth, 1809)
Mythimna venalba (Moore, 1867)
Mythimna yu (Guenée, 1852)
Gyrtona polionota (Hampson, 1905)
Platysenta sp. [Robinson 1975]
Plusiodonta dimorpha Robinson, 1975
Sarbissa bostrychonota (Tams, 1929)
Sasunaga oenistus (Hampson, 1908)
Sasunaga tenebrosa (Moore, 1867)
Sasunaga tomaniiviensis Robinson, 1975
Savoca divitalis pacifica Holloway, 1985
Schinia bifascia Hübner, 1818
Spodoptera acronyctoides Guenée, 1852
Spodoptera cinerea (Holloway, 1979)
Spodoptera exigua (Hübner, 1808)
Spodoptera littoralis (Boisduval, 1833)
Spodoptera litura (Fabricius, 1775)
Spodoptera mauritia (Boisduval, 1833)
Spodoptera picta (Guérin-Méneville, 1838)
Stenopterygia nausoriensis Robinson, 1975
Tiracola plagiata (Walker, 1857)

Nolidae
Apothripa vailimaTarns, 1935
Austrocarea albipicta (Hampson, 1905)
Barasa triangularis Robinson, 1975
Blenina vatu Holloway, 1975
Blenina lichenopa vatu Robinson, 1975
Barasa triangularis Holloway, 1975
Calathusa sp. near basicunea Walker
Carea albipicta Hampson, 1905,
Earias flavida Felder, 1861
Earias huegeli Rogenhofer
Earias luteolaria Hampson, 1891
Earias perhuegelii Holloway, 1977
Earias vittella (Fabricius, 1794)
Etanna basalis Walker, 1862
Etanna breviuscula (Walker, 1863)
Etanna mackwoodi (Hampson, 1902) 
Etanna vailima (Tams, 1935)
Etanna vittalis (Walker, 1866)
Gabala australiata Warren, 1916
Garella nilotica (Rogenhofer, 1882)
Giaura nigrostrigata (Bethune-Baker, 1905)
Giaura sokotokai Robinson, 1969
Giaura spinosa Robinson, 1975
Giaura tetragramma (Hampson, 1905)
Maceda savura Robinson, 1968
Maceda mansueta Walker, 1857
Maurilia iconica (Walker, 1857)
Microthripa buxtoni Tams, 1935
Mniothripa bradleyi D. S. Fletcher, 1957
Nanaguna albisecta Hampson, 1905
Nanaguna breviuscula Walker, 1863
Nanaguna vittalis (Walker, 1866)
Nola fijiensis Robinson, 1975
Nola insularum (Collenette, 1928)
Nola lichenosa Robinson, 1975
Nola samoana Robinson, 1975
Nola savura Clayton, 2018
Nola transversata Robinson, 1975
Nycteola indicatana (Walker, 1863)
Xanthodes congenita (Hampson, 1912)
Xanthodes intersepta Guenée, 1852

Notodontidae
Lasioceros aroa vitiensis Robinson, 1975

Oecophoridae
Calicotis praeusta Meyrick, 1922
Heiromantis ancylogramma Meyrick, 1933
Heiromantis munerata Meyrick, 1924
Heiromantis praemiata Meyrick, 1921
Heiromantis tribolopa Meyrick, 1924
Idiomictis aneuropa Meyrick, 1935
Idiomictis rhizonoma Meyrick, 1935
Peritornenta gennaea Meyrick, 1923
Peritornenta spilanthes Meyrick, 1934
Pseudaegeria squamicornis (Felder & Rogenhofer, 1875)
Stoeberhinus testacea Butler, 1881

Plutellidae
Plutella xylostella (Linnaeus, 1758)

Psychidae
Melasina hemithalama Meyrick, 1935
Narycia ennomopis Meyrick, 1934
Narycia toxophragma Meyrick, 1937
Themeliotis goniozona Meyrick, 1922

Pterophoridae
Imbophorus aptalis (Walker, 1864)
Macropiratis halieutica Meyrick, 1932
Marasmarcha pumilio (Zeller, 1873)
Pterophora candidalis (Walker, 1864)
Pterophora endogramma (Meyrick, 1922)
Sphenarches caffer (Zeller, 1852)

Pyralidae
Acolastodes euryniphas Meyrick, 1934
Acolastodes oenotripta Meyrick, 1934
Anydraula drusiusalis Walker, 1859
Aphomia isodesma (Meyrick, 1886)
Cadra cautella (Walker, 1863)
Calguia hapalanthes (Meyrick, 1932)
Cataclysta cyanolitha (Meyrick, 1886)
Cataclysta hexalitha Meyrick, 1886
Ceratagra mitrophora Meyrick, 1932
Ceratothalama argosema Meyrick, 1932
Citripestis pectinicornella (Hampson, 1896)
Cleticaula philographa Meyrick, 1937
Corcyra cephalonica (Stainton, 1866)
Cryptoblabes ardescens (Meyrick, 1929)
Cryptoblabes gnidiella (Milliere, 1867)
Cryptoblabes plagioleuca Turner, 1904
Cryptoblabes sp. near spodopetina Tams [teste Dugdale, 1978]
Cryptoblabes trabeata Meyrick, 1932
Endotricha capnospila Meyrick, 1932
Endotricha mesenterialis (Walker, 1859)
Endotricha puncticostalis (Walker, 1866)
Ephestia elutella (Hübner, 1796)
Etiella behrii (Zeller, 1848)
Etiella drososcia Meyrick, 1929
Eurhodope holocapna Meyrick, 1932
Eurhodope xanthosperma Meyrick, 1934
Herculia fuscicostalis (Snellen van Vollenhoven, 1880)
Herculia imbecilis (Moore, 1885)
Homoeosoma cataphaea Meyrick, 1886
Homoeosoma hypogypsa Meyrick, 1932
Homoeosoma symmicta Meyrick, 1932
Homoeosoma tepida Meyrick, 1932
Hylopercna seribolax Meyrick, 1934
Hypantidium albicostale (Walker, 1863)
Locastra ardua Swinhoe, 1902
Maxillaria diaconopa Meyrick, 1934
Mussidia pectinicornella (Hampson, 1896a)
Nephopteryx exotypa Meyrick, 1933
Nephopteryx porphyrocapna Meyrick, 1932
Platycrates gypsopeda Meyrick, 1932
Pyralis  manihotalis Guenee, 1854
Rhinaphe nigricostalis (Walker, 1863)
Salebria eomichla Meyrick, 1934
Spatulipalpia leucomichla Meyrick, 1934
Spatulipalpia sideritis Meyrick, 1934
Thalamorrhyncha zalorrhoa (Meyrick, 1934)
Thialella escigera (Meyrick, 1932)
Thialella rhodoptila Meyrick, 1932
Tiratha bachionophthalma Meyrick, 1934
Tiratha complexa (Butler, 1885)
Tiratha epichthonia Meyrick, 1937
Tiratha trichogramma (Meyrick, 1886)
Tornocometis chrysospila Meyrick, 1934
Trisson calathraea Meyrick, 1934
Trisson leucosymbola Meyrick, 1932
Vitessa vitialis Hampson, 1906

Saturniidae
Opodiphthera eucalypti (Scott, 1864)

Sphingidae
Agrius convolvuli (Linnaeus, 1758)
Cephonodes armatus Rothschild & Jordan, 1903
Daphnis placida torenia Druce, 1882
Gnathothlibus erotus eras (Boisduval, 1832)
Gnathothlibus fijiensis Lachlan, 2009
Hippotion celerio (Linnaeus, 1758)
Hippotion scrofa (Boisduval, 1832)
Hippotion velox (Fabricius, 1793)
Macroglossum corythus Walker, 1856
Macroglossum godeffroyi (Butler, 1882)
Macroglossum hirundo samoanum Rothschild & Jordan, 1906
Macroglossum hirundo vitiense Rothschild & Jordan, 1903
Psilogramma jordana Bethune-Baker, 1905
Theretra nessus albata Fukuda, 2003
Theretra nessus nessus (Drury, 1773)
Theretra silhetensis intersecta (Butler, 1875)

Thyrididae
Banisia anthina bella Whalley, 1976
Banisia myrtaea (Drury, 1773)
Hypolamprus hemicycla (Meyrick, 1886)
Morova subfasciata Walker, 1865
Rhodoneura anticalis (Walker, 1866)
Striglina scitaria Walker, 1862
Striglina superior (Butler, 1887)

Tineidae
Aeolarchis sphenotoma Meyrick, 1935
Anastathma callichrysa Meyrick, 1886
Anemerarcha entomaula Meyrick, 1937
Catalectis drosoptila Meyrick, 1924
Catalectis pharetropa Meyrick, 1920
Catalectis ptilozona Meyrick, 1923
Clepticodes clasmatica Meyrick, 1934
Comodica disparata (Meyrick, 1923)
Crypsithyrodes concolorella (Walker, 1863)
Dryadaula terpsichorella (Busck, 1910)
Dryadaula tetraglossa (Meyrick, 1920)
Erechthias dissepta Meyrick, 1931
Erechthias fibrivora (Meyrick, 1933)
Erechthias flavistriata (Walsingham, 1907)
Erechthias glyphidaula (Meyrick, 1933)
Erechthias heterogramma (Meyrick, 1921)
Erechthias minuscula (Walsingham, 1897)
Erechthias psammaula (Meyrick, 1921)
Erechthias simulans (Butler, 1882)
Erechthias sisyranthes (Meyrick, 1930)
Erechthias sphenacma Meyrick, 1926
Erechthias subridens (Meyrick, 1923)
Erechthias zebrina (Butler, 1881)
Monopis pentadisca Meyrick, 1924
Monopis stichomela Lower, 1900
Opogona allaini Clarke, 1971
Opogona amblyxena Meyrick, 1920
Opogona aurisquamosa (Butler, 1881)
Opogona citrinodes (Meyrick, 1922)
Opogona dimidiatella Zeller, 1853
Opogona hapalopa (Meyrick, 1922)
Opogona regressa Meyrick, 1916
Pherooe caverna (Meyrick, 1924)
Proterospastis wainimbuka Robinson, 1980
Pontodryas loxosema Meyrick, 1920
Setomorpha rutella Zeller, 1852
Tinea chlorospora Meyrick, 1924
Tiquadra maculata (Meyrick, 1886)
Trachycentra calamias Meyrick, 1886
Trachycentra chlorogramma Meyrick, 1907
Triadogona amphileucota Meyrick, 1937
Trichophaga abruptella (Wollaston, 1858)

Tortricidae
Acanthoclita defensa (Meyrick, 1922)
Acanthoclita expulsa Razowski, 2016
Acanthoclita trichograpta (Meyrick, 1911)
Adoxophyes cyrtosema  Meyrick 1886
Adoxophyes fasciculana (Walker, 1866)
Adoxophyes mixtior Razowski, 2016
Adoxophyes privatana (Walker, 1863)
Ancylis charisema Meyrick, 1934
Aphrozestis scoriopa Meyrick, 1931
Argyroploce immanis (Meyrick, 1886)
Arotrophora fijigena Razowski, 2009
Arotrophora tubulosa Razowski, 2009
Atriscripta arithmetica (Meyrick, 1921)
Atriscripta strigata Razowski, 2016
Bactra angulata Diakonoff, 1956
Bactra blepharopis Meyrick, 1911
Bactra venosana (Zeller, 1847)
Capua endocypha Meyrick, 1931
Coenobiodes rubrogrisea Razowski, 2016
Collogenes dascia (Bradley, 1962)
Crocidosema plebejana Zeller, 1847
Crocidosema lantana Busck, 1910
Cryptophlebia emphyla Razowski, 2016
Cryptophlebia illepida (Butler, 1882)
Cryptophlebia ombrodelta (Lower, 1898)
Cryptophlebia pallifimbriata Bradley, 1953
Cryptophlebia repletana (Walker, 1863)
Cryptophlebia rhynchias Meyrick, 1905
Cryptophlebia sp. near amblyona Clarke [teste Dugdale, 1978]
Cryptophlebia vitiensis Bradley, 1953
Diactenis orthometalla (Meyrick, 1922)
Dichelopa lamii Razowski, 2016
Dichelopa litota Razowski, 2016
Dudua aprobola (Meyrick, 1886)
Dudua lamiana Razowski, 2016
Eccoptocera bidolon Razowski, 2016
Eccoptocera platamon Razowski, 2016
Epitrichosma metretoma Rasowski, 2016
Eucosma baryphragma Meyrick, 1937
Eucosma defensa Meyrick, 1922
Eucosma eumarodes Meyrick, 1924
Gnathmocerodes lecythocera (Meyrick, 1937)
Grapholita trossula Razowski, 2016
Heleanna physalodes (Meyrick, 1926)
Helictophanes prospera (Meyrick, 1909)
Icelita grossoperas Razowski, 2016
Leurogyia fijiensis Razowski, 2016
Lobesia orthomorpha (Meyrick, 1928)
Lobesia rhipidoma (Meyrick, 1925)
Metaselena russata Razowski, 2016
Metaselena ruborata Razowski, 2016
Mimperiphoeba opaca Razowski, 2016
Nairips mastrus Razowski, 2016
Nesoscopa mesites Razowski, 2014
Noduliferola cothovalva Razowoski, 2016
Noduliferola neothela (Turner, 1916)
Noduliferola transiens Razowoski, 2016
Olethreutes anaprobola (Bradley, 1953)
Olethreutes ancosema (Meyrick, 1932)
Olethreutes pachypleura (Meyrick, 1924)
Paratoonavora scalpta Razowski, 2016
Peraglyphis eida Razowski, 2016
Periphoeba adluminana Bradley, 1957
Proactenis leucocharis (Meyrick, 1933)
Procoronis swinhoeiana (Walsingham, 1890)
Psegmatica pachnostola Meyrick, 1930
Pseudancylis bisignum Razowski, 2016
Pseudancylis rostrifera (Meyrick, 1912)
Pteridoporthis euryloxa Meyrick, 1937
Rhopobota ochyra Razowski, 2016
Rhopobota splendida Clayton, 2017
Semniotes halantha (Meyrick, 1909)
Spilonota cryptogramma Meyrick, 1922
Spilonota lygaea Razowski, 2016
Spilonota pachyspina Razowski, 2016
Statherotis ancosema (Meyrick, 1932)
Statherotis leucaspis (Meyrick, 1902)
Strepsicrates ejectana (Walker, 1863)
Strepsicrates glaucothoe (Meyrick, 1927)
Strepsicrates poliophora Bradley, 1962
Syncratus nairayawae Razowski, 2016
Teleta talaris (Durrant, 1915)
Thaumatotibia grammica Razoswki, 2016
Thaumatotibia zophophanes (Turner,1946)
Tortrix leucocharis Meyrick, 1933
Tritopterna cnephata Razowski, 2016
Trymalitis cataracta Meyrick, 1907
Trymalitis macarista Meyrick, 1934
Trymalitis optima Meyrick, 1911
Xenothictis atriflora Meyrick, 1930

Uraniidae
Urapteroides anerces (Meyrick, 1886)
Urapteroides hermaea (Druce, 1888)

Yponomeutidae
Atteva aleatrix Meyrick, 1922
Bedellia somnulentella Zeller, 1847
Callithrinca niphopyrrha Meyrick, 1927
Caminophantis mystolitha Meyrick, 1933
Prays citri Millière, 1873

Zyganeidae
Heteropan dolens Druce, 1888
Levuana iridescens Bethune-Baker, 1906

References 

Razowski, 2016. Tortricidae (Lepidoptera) of the Fiji Islands - Acta zoologica cracoviensia, 59(1)

External links 
Checklist of Fijian Lepidoptera by Neal L. Evenhuis

Lepidoptera
Lepidoptera
Fiji
Fiji
Fiji
Fiji
Fiji